Amora Mautner (born May 24, 1975) is a Brazilian television director and former actress. She has worked in many telenovelas and TV series broadcast by Rede Globo.

Biography
Mautner was born in Rio de Janeiro on May 24, 1975. She is the only daughter of famous singer and writer Jorge Mautner and historian Ruth Mendes, and is of Austrian-Jewish and Yugoslav descent on her father's side. She initially debuted as an actress, portraying Paula in the 1991–92 telenovela Vamp, and also appeared in an episode of the TV series Você Decide, but later abandoned the acting career to become involved in directing.

She debuted as assistant director in the first season of the long-running soap opera Malhação in 1995, but wouldn't direct her first telenovela until O Cravo e a Rosa from 2000. In 2012, Mautner and Ricardo Waddington (who would become one of her most frequent collaborators) won the Prêmio Contigo! de TV, in the category "Best Director", for Cordel Encantado. After her work in the successful Avenida Brasil, which was nominated to the International Emmy Award for Best Telenovela (and won her yet another Prêmio Contigo! de TV for Best Director in 2013), and Joia Rara, she was promoted to Rede Globo's art director in 2014.

On an interview to Época magazine from September 15, 2016, she stated that after she ended work on her most recent telenovela, A Regra do Jogo (2015–16), which was nominated to the International Emmy Award for Best Telenovela, she would take a temporary break from TV in order to begin work on her first full-length film, an adaptation of Fyodor Dostoevsky's novel The Gambler. It was slated to enter pre-production in 2017, and shooting would begin in Argentina in 2018, but no further news regarding the project emerged since then. On June 26, 2017, she expressed her desire to direct a film adaptation of Raphael Montes' 2014 thriller novel Dias Perfeitos. She was originally slated to return to television in 2018, to direct the upcoming telenovela Órfãos da Terra (initially known as Sal da Terra), by Duca Rachid and Thelma Guedes, who also wrote Joia Rara; however, this did not come to fruition.

On December 19, 2016, it was reported that she began work on a miniseries based on Dostoevsky's The Brothers Karamazov, scheduled to be broadcast in 2018 by Rede Globo; Caio Blat and Carolina Dieckmann are being eyed to star. In 2017 she was chosen to direct the biographical miniseries Assédio, written by Maria Camargo and inspired by the non-fiction book A Clínica, by Vicente Vilardaga, about the life and crimes of rapist and former physician Roger Abdelmassih, who was portrayed by Antonio Calloni. The series' 10 episodes premiered on September 21, 2018, on Globo's streaming service Globoplay.

Despite her success, Mautner is often criticized by the actors she has worked with and other acquaintances as being too "strict" and "perfectionist". In 2017 it was reported that she fell out in favor with many of Rede Globo's telenovela writers, allegedly because of her "temperamental" demeanor, creative divergences with João Emanuel Carneiro and the lukewarm reception of A Regra do Jogo.

Personal life
Mautner was married to actor Marcos Palmeira from 2005 to 2012. The couple had a daughter, Júlia, born 2007.

Since 2015 Mautner is dating Arnon Affonso, son of former Brazilian President Fernando Collor.

Filmography

Television

As actress
 1991–92: Vamp – Paula
 1992: Você Decide (season 1, episode 29)

As assistant director
 1995: Malhação (season 1 only)
 1996–97: Salsa e Merengue
 1997–98: Anjo Mau
 1998: Dona Flor e Seus Dois Maridos
 1998: Labirinto
 1999: Andando nas Nuvens

As director
 2000–01: O Cravo e a Rosa
 2001: Um Anjo Caiu do Céu
 2002: Desejos de Mulher
 2003: Agora É que São Elas
 2003–04: Celebridade
 2005: Mad Maria
 2006: JK
 2007: Paraíso Tropical
 2008: Três Irmãs
 2009–10: Cama de Gato
 2010: As Cariocas
 2011: Cordel Encantado
 2012: Avenida Brasil
 2013: Joia Rara
 2014: Eu que Amo Tanto
 2015–16: A Regra do Jogo
 2018: Assédio

Film

As director
 TBA: O Jogador

References

External links
 

1975 births
Living people
Brazilian television directors
People from Rio de Janeiro (city)
Brazilian telenovela actresses
20th-century Brazilian actresses
Brazilian people of Austrian-Jewish descent
Brazilian people of Yugoslav descent
Portuguese-language film directors
Women television directors